XHBD-FM is a radio station on 104.9 FM in Xalapa, Veracruz. It is owned by Grupo Oliva Radio and known as El Patrón with a grupera format.

History
XEBD-AM 1100, based in Perote, received its concession on December 16, 1971. It was owned by Francisco González de la Barrera and broadcast with 250 watts. By 1991, it had moved to Banderilla on 1210 kHz, with 10,000 watts during the day and 200 at night.

XEBD was authorized to move to FM in November 2010 and approved for a signal upgrade in 2018.

The concessionaire, Radio Lujo, is named for Luis Miguel and José Luis Oliva Cano, who own Grupo Oliva Radio.

References

Radio stations in Veracruz
Radio stations established in 1971